is a former Japanese football player.

Playing career
Umezawa was born in Mie Prefecture on December 7, 1972. After graduating from high school, he joined Matsushita Electric (later Gamba Osaka) in 1991. He could not play at all in the match until 1993. He debuted against Yokohama Marinos on June 8, 1994. However he could hardly play in the match and retired end of 1994 season.

Club statistics

References

External links

1972 births
Living people
Association football people from Mie Prefecture
Japanese footballers
Japan Soccer League players
J1 League players
Gamba Osaka players
Association football midfielders